The 1992 Big Bear earthquake occurred at  on June 28 in Big Bear Lake, California, with a moment magnitude of 6.5 and a maximum perceived intensity of VIII (Severe) on the Mercalli intensity scale.

Earthquake
The Big Bear earthquake happened east of Los Angeles, and 3 hours 8 minutes after the M 7.3 1992 Landers earthquake occurred 22 miles (35 km) to the east. It was first believed to be an aftershock of the larger event.  However, the United States Geological Survey determined that it was a separate, but related, shock. The two events are considered a regional sequence, rather than a main shock and aftershock. They were part of a complex pattern of regional stress adjustment that also led to the 1999 Hector Mine earthquake.

Damage
In the Big Bear area, severe damage was reported. Roughly 2,600 chimneys were destroyed, 20 homes were knocked off their foundations, and many unreinforced masonry structures partially or completely collapsed. Ruptured gas pipelines and dislodged fuel tanks caused by the tremor sparked fires that destroyed additional structures. The earthquake also caused landslides in the San Bernardino Mountains, blocking several roadways and creating dust clouds that led many to believe forest fires were occurring. The Stanfield Cutoff was heavily damaged, and had to be closed for several days for repairs.

Marilyn Quayle, wife of then-Vice President Dan Quayle, toured the damage in Big Bear. In total, approximately 40 percent of structures in the Big Bear area suffered some degree of damage, amounting to more than $60 million in losses. 63 injuries were attributed to this earthquake, most of which were minor.

See also

List of earthquakes in California
List of earthquakes in the United States

References

External links
 M 6.3 - 7km SSE of Big Bear City, CA – United States Geological Survey
 

1992
1992 earthquakes
1992 in California
1992 natural disasters in the United States
Big Bear Lake, California